1998 Emperor's Cup Final was the 78th final of the Emperor's Cup competition. The final was played at National Stadium in Tokyo on January 1, 1999. Yokohama Flügels won the championship.

Overview
Yokohama Flügels won their 2nd title, by defeating Shimizu S-Pulse 2–1 with goals from Yoshikiyo Kuboyama and Takayuki Yoshida. This would be the Yokohama Flugels' last ever game, before being merged with the Yokohama Marinos to become the modern day Yokohama F Marinos.

Match details

See also
1998 Emperor's Cup

References

Emperor's Cup
1998 in Japanese football
Yokohama Flügels matches
Shimizu S-Pulse matches